Tobias Krick (born 22 October 1998) is a German professional volleyball player. He is part of the German national team and a silver medallist at the 2017 European Championship. At the professional club level, he plays for Valsa Group Modena.

References

External links

 
 Player profile at LegaVolley.it 
 Player profile at Volleybox.net

1998 births
Living people
People from Bingen am Rhein
Sportspeople from Rhineland-Palatinate
German men's volleyball players
German expatriate sportspeople in Italy
Expatriate volleyball players in Italy
Modena Volley players
Middle blockers